Jauer may refer to:

 Jauer (Romansh), a variety of the Romansh language spoken in the Val Müstair, Graubünden, Switzerland
 Jauer (surname)
 Jauer (river), a river in Saxony, Germany

See also 
 Jauerfood, a Danish company
 Jawor, a town in Poland
 Duchy of Jawor, a former Principality of the Holy Roman Empire, now part of Poland